Rance Pless (December 6, 1925 – November 11, 2017) was an American professional baseball player. A third baseman, first baseman and outfielder over the course of a 14-year professional career, he played part of one season of Major League Baseball with the 1956 Kansas City Athletics.

Pless was born in Greeneville, Tennessee. His career began in the New York Giants' minor league organization as an outfielder in 1947. In nine seasons in the Giants' farm system, he won two batting championships, in the 1952 Double-A Southern Association (.364)  and the 1955 Triple-A American Association (.337). After the latter season, he was acquired by the Kansas City A's, who played him in 48 games as a third baseman, first baseman and pinch hitter during 1956. Pless collected 23 hits in 85 at bats, including three doubles and one triple. Playing 15 games at first base and 5 games at third base, Pless handled 162 total chances without an error for a 1.000 fielding percentage. He also played part of that season for the Triple-A Richmond Virginians. Pless retired from baseball after the 1960 season with a career minor league batting average of .303 in 1,755 games. He died on November 11, 2017.

References

External links
Career statistics from Baseball Reference

1925 births
2017 deaths
Atlanta Braves scouts
Baseball players from Tennessee
Kansas City Athletics players
Major League Baseball first basemen
Major League Baseball third basemen
Bristol Twins players
St. Cloud Rox players
Trenton Giants players
Jacksonville Tars players
Vicksburg Hill Billies players
Sioux City Soos players
Nashville Vols players
Minneapolis Millers (baseball) players
Richmond Virginians (minor league) players
Omaha Cardinals players
Denver Bears players
Birmingham Barons players
Little Rock Travelers players
People from Greeneville, Tennessee
American Association (1902–1997) MVP Award winners